Alexander John Horvath (born December 10, 1998) is an American football fullback for the Los Angeles Chargers of the National Football League (NFL). He played college football at Purdue.

Early life
Zander went to Mishawaka Catholic for middle school, where he played football and graduated from in 2013. Horvath then also played football at Marian High School in Mishawaka, Indiana. He recorded 3,373 yards and 50 touchdowns on the ground, earning all-state and USA Today Midwest Regional All-American honors.

College career
Horvath initially committed to Indiana to play linebacker as a preferred walk-on, but switched commitments when Purdue running backs coach Chris Barclay offered him a chance to play his natural position of running back.

Horvath did not play in 2017. 

In 2018, Horvath appeared in 13 games, rushing nine times for 42 yards and a touchdown. Horvath also caught four passes for 38 yards.

In 2019, Horvath's role expanded. Horvath appeared in 11 games, starting four. He rushed 79 times for 377 yards and two touchdowns, and caught 17 passes for 142 yards and a touchdown. 

In the pandemic-shortened 2020 season, Horvath appeared in 6 games, starting five. He rushed 89 times for 442 yards and two touchdowns, and caught 30 passes for 304 yards.

In his senior year of 2021, Horvath rushed 91 times for 320 yards, and caught 17 passes for 108 yards.

Professional career
Initially not projected to be a drafted player, Horvath intrigued scouts with his elite positional athleticism for a fullback, scoring a 9.83 out of 10 Raw Athletic Score (RAS).

Horvath was selected by the Los Angeles Chargers in the seventh round (260th overall) of the 2022 NFL Draft.

Horvath became the first running back or fullback to catch a touchdown in his first two games since 1942.

References

External links

 Los Angeles Chargers bio
Purdue Boilermakers bio

1998 births
Living people
People from Mishawaka, Indiana
Players of American football from Indiana
American football fullbacks
American people of Hungarian descent
Purdue Boilermakers football players
Los Angeles Chargers players